Yuma Hattori (born 13 November 1993) is a Japanese long-distance runner.

In 2018, he won the Fukuoka Marathon in a time of 2:07:27. He qualified for the marathon at the 2020 Summer Olympics by finishing second in the 2019  with a time of 2:11.36.

Personal bests
Outdoor
5000 metres – 13:36.76 (Kitami 2015)
10000 metres – 27:47.55 (Kumagaya 2020)
Half marathon – 1:01:40 (Ústí nad Labem 2018)
Marathon – 2:07:27 (Fukuoka 2018)

References

1993 births
Living people
Japanese male long-distance runners
Sportspeople from Niigata Prefecture
Olympic athletes of Japan
Athletes (track and field) at the 2020 Summer Olympics
Japanese male marathon runners
Olympic male marathon runners
20th-century Japanese people
21st-century Japanese people